The Kurogane Baby was a keitora and microvan built by the Japanese Kurogane company from April 1959 until January 1961, sold only in Japan. It was developed by a company of which Kurogane had assumed operations, called Ohta Jidosha, but was introduced under the Kurogane brand and was only available until 1962. It had a 356-cc, water-cooled, overhead-valve, two-cylinder engine installed in the back of the vehicle, with rear-wheel drive. The more competitively priced Subaru Sambar and the Suzuki Carry proved to be more popular and the Baby was discontinued after less than two years. It was available in two bodystyles, a van and a pickup.

References

Microvans
Pickup trucks
Cab over vehicles
Kei trucks
Rear-engined vehicles
Rear-wheel-drive vehicles
Vehicles introduced in 1959